The London and Provincial Bank, originally known as the Provincial Banking Corporation, was established in 1864.

It took over Day, Nicholson and Stone in 1864, and the Bank of Wales in 1865. It was reorganised in 1870 and became the London and Provincial Bank Limited with an authorised capital of £1m. In 1871/72 it acquired the firm of Fincham and Simpson.

Most branches were in suburbs of London, the eastern counties of England and south Wales. In 1917 it merged with the London and South Western, to form the London, Provincial and South Western Bank, which was acquired by Barclays Bank in 1918.

References

External links 

Defunct banks of the United Kingdom
Barclays
Banking in Wales